Sowerby is a surname. Notable people with the surname include:

Sowerby family, a British family of naturalists and artists
Arthur de Carle Sowerby (1885–1954), British explorer in China
Charlotte Caroline Sowerby (1820–1865), British natural history illustrator
George Brettingham Sowerby I (1788–1854), British malacologist
George Brettingham Sowerby II (1812–1884), British malacologist
George Brettingham Sowerby III (1843–1921), British malacologist
James Sowerby (1757–1822), British zoologist and painter
James Sowerby (1815–1834), British mycologist
James de Carle Sowerby (1787–1871), English scientist and artist
John Edward Sowerby (1825–1870), artist and publisher 
E. Millicent Sowerby (1883–1977), English bibliographer
Francis Sowerby Macaulay, British mathematician
Fred Sowerby (born 1948), Antigua and Barbuda sprinter
Githa Sowerby (1876–1970), English playwright
John George Sowerby (1850–1914), English painter and illustrator
Leo Sowerby (1895–1968), twentieth-century American composer
Millicent Sowerby (1878–1967), English painter and illustrator
William Sowerby (clergyman) (1799–1875), English clergyman
William Sowerby (politician) (born 1956), American politician

Fictional characters 
 From The Secret Garden by Frances Hodgson Burnett
 Dickon Sowerby, a main character with knowledge about nature
 Martha Sowerby, a servant at the house and Mary's maid
 Mrs Sowerby, Dickon and Martha's mother.

English toponymic surnames